Pigalle may refer to:

Places
Paris, France
Quartier Pigalle, an area in Paris around the Place Pigalle, on the border between the 9th and the 18th arrondissements
Place Pigalle, public square in the Quartier Pigalle at the foot of the Montmartre hill
Pigalle (Paris Métro), a station on lines 2 and 12 of the Paris Métro
Théâtre Pigalle, was a theatre in Paris, located in the rue Pigalle in the ninth arrondissement

Elsewhere
Pigalle Club, a supper club and live music venue in Piccadilly, London

Arts
Pigalle (band), French rock band formed in 1982
Pigalle (documentary), a 2006 documentary by Asa Mader
Pigalle (film), a 1994 film by Karim Dridi

Persons
Anne Pigalle, French chanteuse (singer) and multimedia artist
Jean-Baptiste Pigalle (1714–1785), French sculptor
Sabine Pigalle (born 1963), French photographer